Ryszard Skwarski (5 April 1930 in Zakroczym - 1 June 1996) was a Polish sprint canoer who competed in the late 1950s and early 1960s. Competing in two Summer Olympics, he earned his best finish of fourth in the K-1 4 × 500 m event at Rome in 1960.

References

Sports-reference.com profile

1930 births
1996 deaths
Canoeists at the 1956 Summer Olympics
Canoeists at the 1960 Summer Olympics
Olympic canoeists of Poland
Polish male canoeists
People from Nowy Dwór Mazowiecki County
Sportspeople from Masovian Voivodeship